Statistics of Japanese Regional Leagues for the 1968 season.

Champions list

League standings

Kanto

Tokai

Kansai

1968
Japanese Regional Leagues
2